Lorenzo Piqué (born 17 September 1990) is a Dutch professional footballer who plays as a centre back for TOP Oss in the Dutch Eerste Divisie.

Club career 

In his youth, Piqué played for Feyenoord, but never made his debut. He played most of his games for the reserve team, Jong Feyenoord.

In 2009, Piqué was transferred to ADO Den Haag, where he signed a contract until the summer of 2010. Because of the injury of his cousin, Mitchell Piqué, he played many friendly games in the pre-season as left-back. He made his debut in the 3–0 loss to Ajax on 27 September due to an injury of Ahmed Ammi.

In the 2010–11 season, Piqué mainly played in the reserve team of ADO, partly due to depth and competition at the centre back position from the likes of Ramon Leeuwin and Christian Supusepa.

On 1 August 2011, Piqué moved to FC Volendam, where he signed a one-year deal. In September 2012, he initially moved to fifth-tier Hoofdklasse club ASWH, but the Royal Dutch Football Association (KNVB) declared him ineligible to play, which meant that Piqué could only practice until receiving a playing license in the winter break. Therefore, he decided to trial with FC Oss, where he eventually signed a contract on 17 October 2012, until the end of the 2012–13 season.

Piqué left Oss in June 2018, but returned in January 2019 after not finding a new club during the summer transfer window. The club had at that point changed its name to TOP Oss. After the 2019–20 Eerste Divisie season, Piqué had made 221 league appearances for the club, in which he scored four goals.

Personal life
Born in the Netherlands, Piqué is of Surinamese descent.

References

External links
 

1990 births
Living people
Dutch footballers
Dutch sportspeople of Surinamese descent
ADO Den Haag players
FC Volendam players
TOP Oss players
Eredivisie players
Eerste Divisie players
Footballers from Rotterdam
ASWH players
Association football defenders